Kantang is a district (amphoe) in the western part of Trang province, Thailand.

History
Kantang was the original capital of Trang Province, at first in Khuan Thani, and then from 1893 to 1916 in Kantang itself. As the area was prone to flooding, the capital was moved inland to its present location. The city pillar shrine (lak mueang) of Trang is still at its original location at Khuan Thani.

Geography
Neighboring districts are (from the north clockwise): Sikao, Mueang Trang, and Yan Ta Khao of Trang Province. To the southwest is the Andaman Sea. The district is at the mouth of the Trang River.

Administration

The district is divided into 14 sub-districts (tambons), which are further subdivided into 83 villages (mubans). The town (thesaban mueang) Kantang covers the entire tambon Kantang. There are 13 tambon administrative organizations (TAO) in the district.

Economy
The Kantang District's chief industry is fishing. The industry is highly concentrated in few hands and has recently come under fire by international organisations for human trafficking, over-fishing, abuse of human rights, and outright murder. An Environmental Justice Foundation video went so far as to name Kanatang's Boonlarp Fishing Partnership, Ltd., as a particularly egregious bad actor.

References

External links
amphoe.com (Thai)

Districts of Trang province